Stuart Mangin (born 8 February 1977) is a former Australian rules footballer who played with Collingwood in the Australian Football League (AFL).

Mangin, who was from Macleod originally, was playing with the Northern Knights in the TAC Cup when drafted by the Sydney Swans.
 He only played reserves football for the Swans and was traded to Collingwood at the end of the 1997 season. The trade saw Mangin and teammate Clinton King go to Collingwood, in exchange of Robert Ahmat and the draft selection which secured Fred Campbell.

He made three appearances for Collingwood in the 1998 AFL season and in the last of those kicked two goals against Richmond at the Melbourne Cricket Ground. A defender, he later played at Norwood.

References

External links
 
 

1977 births
Australian rules footballers from Victoria (Australia)
Collingwood Football Club players
Norwood Football Club players
Northern Knights players
Living people